Events in the year 1847 in Brazil.

Incumbents
Monarch – Pedro II.
Prime Minister – 2nd Viscount of Caravelas (starting 22 August).

Events

Births
 14 March - Castro Alves
 13 July - Princess Leopoldina of Brazil, daughter of Emperor Pedro II
 2 September - José Carlos de Carvalho Júnior
 30 November - Afonso Pena

Deaths

References

 
1840s in Brazil
Years of the 19th century in Brazil
Brazil
Brazil